Raymond R. "Ray" Calverley (born 3 April 1951 in Haslingden) is a British retired slalom canoeist who competed from the late 1960s to the mid-1970s. He won a silver medal in the K-1 team event at the 1969 ICF Canoe Slalom World Championships in Bourg St.-Maurice.

Calverley finished 32nd in the K-1 event at the 1972 Summer Olympics in Munich.

Calverley was a graduate of Fitzwilliam College, Cambridge.

References

Sports-reference.com profile

1951 births
English male canoeists
Canoeists at the 1972 Summer Olympics
Living people
Olympic canoeists of Great Britain
People from Haslingden
Alumni of Fitzwilliam College, Cambridge
British male canoeists
Medalists at the ICF Canoe Slalom World Championships